Fulgoraria allaryi is a species of sea snail, a marine gastropod mollusk in the family Volutidae, the volutes.

Description
A species of predatory sea snails known for the spiraling and curved features of their shell. The length of the shell attains 222.5 mm.

Distribution
This species occurs in the South China Sea off Hainan, China

References

 Bail P. 2005. A new species of Fulgoraria Pilsbry & Olsson,1954 (Gastropoda: Volutidae) from the South China Sea. Novapex 6(4): 115-117

allaryi
Gastropods described in 2005